is a Japanese singer and model. She is a former member of Team M of the Japanese idol girl group NMB48.

Career 
Shiroma passed NMB48's first-generation auditions in September 2010, debuting on 9 October 2010 at Tokyo Aki Matsuri. Her stage debut was on 1 January 2011. In March 2011, Shiroma was selected to form Team N. In February 2014, during the AKB48 Group Shuffle, it was announced she would be transferred to Team M. In the 2014 general elections, Shiroma ranked for the first time, placing 43rd with 17,745 votes. In September 2014, during AKB48's 2014 Janken Tournament, it was announced she would be selected for AKB48's 38th single Kibōteki Refrain. In the same month, it was also announced she and Fuuko Yagura would be the centers for NMB48's 10th single Rashikunai.

In May 2018, she participated in the reality television series Produce 48 and ranked 20th, unable to debut with the show's project group. In 2019, her first photobook, "LOVE RUSH", was released. In November 2019, Shiroma acted in Battles Without Honor and Humanity: On'na-tachi no Shitō-hen, a stage adaptation of the Battles Without Honor and Humanity yakuza film series. She played the role of Tetsuya Sakai, based on Hiroki Matsukata's original portrayal.

On 2 March 2021, during the finale of the NAMBATTLE project at the Orix Theater, Shiroma announced her graduation from NMB48 - the last first-generation member to do so. Her graduation concert took place at the Osaka Castle Hall on 15 August. She officially graduated from the group on 31 August, with one last performance at the NMB48 Theater.

On 14 January 2022, it was announced that Shiroma would make her solo artist debut under Universal Music Japan. Her debut single, "Shine Bright", was released on 6 July and ranked 13th on the weekly Oricon Singles Chart.

Discography

Solo singles

NMB48 singles

NMB48 Albums
 Teppen Tottande!
 "Teppen Tottande!"
 "12/31"
 "Lily" / Team N
 "Namekuji Heart"

 Sekai no Chuushin wa Osaka ya ~Namba Jichiku~
 "Ibiza girl"
 ""Seito Techo no Shashin wa Ki ni Haittenai" no Hoshoku"
 "Natsu no Saiminjutsu" / Team M
 "Peak"

 Namba Ai (Ima, Omou Koto)
 "Masaka Singapore"
 "Namba Ai"
 "Boku wa Aisarete wa Inai" / Solo

AKB48 singles

AKB48 Albums
 Koko ni Ita Koto
 "Koko ni Ita Koto"

 1830m
 "Aozora yo Sabishikunai Ka?"

 Koko ga Rhodes da, Koko de Tobe!
 "Koko ga Rhodes da, Koko de Tobe!"

 0 to 1 no Aida
 "Clap" / Team A

 Thumbnail
 "Subete wa Tochuu Keika"

 Bokutachi wa, Ano Hi no Yoake wo Shitteiru
 "Kutsuhimo no Musubikata"
 "Mystery Line"

Appearances

Stage units
NMB48 Team N 1st Stage 
 
NMB48 Team N 2nd Stage 
 
NMB48 Team N 3rd Stage 
 
 
 
NMB48 Team M 2nd Stage "Reset"

TV variety
  (2012)
  (2013– )
 AKBingo! (2015–2018)
 Produce 48 (2018)

TV dramas
  (2015) as Shirogiku
  (2015) as Shirogiku
  Ep.15 - Hole (2015)
  Ep.2 - Forbidden Mischief (2016) as Fumika
  (2016), Shirogiku

Movies
  (2013)

References

External links
 
 

1997 births
Living people
Japanese idols
Japanese women pop singers
People from Osaka Prefecture
Musicians from Osaka Prefecture
NMB48 members
Produce 48 contestants
Universal Music Japan artists
21st-century Japanese women singers
21st-century Japanese singers